Jeffrey Todd Jablon (born 1964) is a United States Navy rear admiral and submarine warfare officer serving as Commander, Submarine Force, U.S. Pacific Fleet since April 29, 2021. He previously served as director of military personnel plans and policy of the United States Navy.

Raised in Frostburg, Maryland, Jablon graduated from Virginia Tech in 1987 with a bachelor's degree in mechanical engineering. He later earned an M.B.A. degree from James Madison University.

Awards and decorations

References

Date of birth missing (living people)
1964 births
Living people
Place of birth missing (living people)
People from Frostburg, Maryland
Virginia Tech alumni
Military personnel from Maryland
James Madison University alumni
United States submarine commanders
Recipients of the Distinguished Service Medal (United States)
Recipients of the Defense Superior Service Medal
Recipients of the Legion of Merit
United States Navy admirals